Joshua Frederick Wagenaar (born February 26, 1985 in Grimsby, Ontario) is a  Canadian retired soccer player, who is currently an assistant coach at Louisiana Tech.

Club career
Wagenaar attended Hartwick College in Oneonta, New York state. He only played 12 games for them in his final season because of a foot injury. In 2002, he played with London City in the Canadian Professional Soccer League.

Netherlands and Denmark
Wagenaar began his career in the Netherlands as #2 behind the infamous Stefan Postma. He played his first professional game against PSV when he came in after Postma broke his leg in a collision. Wagenaar started the next game against AZ Alkmaar in which ADO Den Haag drew 2-2 earning Den Haags first point of the season. During the game Wagenaar suffered a torn muscle in his rib cage and was unable to start the next game. The season ended with Wagenaar only playing a couple more games and ADO Den Haag being relegated. Halfway through his second year he left Den Haag and went to the States to focus on Olympic Qualifying with the Canadian U-23 team. Canada lost out for the final place at the Beijing olympics to a quality US team that included Sacha Kljestan, Freddy Adu, Johnathan Spector, and Jozy Altidore. After the olympic qualifying Wagenaar latched onto an already relegated Lyngby BK of the Danish Superliga for the final two months of their season.

Yeovil Town
In July 2008 he joined English League One side Leeds United on a trial, but was not offered a contract. On 6 August 2008, after a successful trial, he officially signed for League One side Yeovil Town to answer the club's urgent need for a goalkeeper.

For the first three months of the season he was second choice behind "one-time" Canadian goalkeeper Asmir Begović, but after Begović's loan ended, Wagenaar played every game, and made the League One Team of the Week after a match against Southend United.

He passed a medical for Falkirk and signed a one-year deal. He was released at the end of the season after Falkirk were relegated. He then went on trial at Seattle Sounders FC.

International career
In the summer of 2005, Wagenaar played for the U-20 Canadian national team at the World Youth Cup in the Netherlands.

He made his senior international debut in a friendly against Hungary on November 15, 2006. He played his second game against Guatemala, playing 45 minutes he kept a clean sheet on June 30, 2009. Wagenaar was also chosen in the 23-man roster for the 2009 CONCACAF Gold Cup, Canada won Group A with 7 points before being knocked out by Honduras in the Quarter Finals. Wagenaar played his third game for Canada in a 3–0 loss to Macedonia on November 14, 2009, playing the full 90 minutes. Wagenaar played his fourth game for Canada in a 1–1 draw against Venezuela.

References

External links

Profile on Yeovil's Official website

Profile – Falkirk FC

1985 births
Living people
People from Grimsby, Ontario
Canadian people of Dutch descent
Association football goalkeepers
Soccer people from Ontario
Canadian soccer players
Canadian expatriate soccer players
Canada men's international soccer players
2009 CONCACAF Gold Cup players
Canadian expatriate sportspeople in the United States
Canadian expatriate sportspeople in Denmark
Canadian expatriate sportspeople in the Netherlands
St. Catharines Roma Wolves players
Hartwick Hawks men's soccer players
London City players
ADO Den Haag players
Lyngby Boldklub players
Yeovil Town F.C. players
Falkirk F.C. players
Eredivisie players
Canadian Soccer League (1998–present) players
Danish Superliga players
Expatriate soccer players in the United States
Expatriate footballers in the Netherlands
Expatriate men's footballers in Denmark
Expatriate footballers in England
Expatriate footballers in Scotland
Canada men's youth international soccer players
Canada men's under-23 international soccer players
Canadian expatriate sportspeople in Scotland
Canadian expatriate sportspeople in England